Shireoaks is a former pit village and civil parish in Nottinghamshire, located between Worksop and Thorpe Salvin on the border with South Yorkshire. The population of the civil parish was 1,432 at the 2011 census. Shireoaks colliery was opened in 1854. It was closed on 25 May 1991 and was capped in August 1992. The depth of the shaft was 483.5m and the shaft's diameter was 3.66m.

The Chesterfield Canal and River Ryton both run through the village. The main A57 between Sheffield and Worksop passes close to the village and there are rail services to Sheffield, Lincoln and Cleethorpes on the Sheffield to Lincoln Line, which has a station at Shireoaks railway station.

Facilities 

Current facilities include a convenience store, which is also the post office, a small shop, wine bar, school, village hall, Sports and Social Club, with bowling green and football pitch. The village has one pub, the Hewett Arms. A former pub, the Station Hotel, has been converted into a private dwelling.

The local Church of England parish church is dedicated to St Luke. Main article

Canal & River Trust's Shireoaks Marina is a few minutes walk along the towpath from the village making it easily accessible for visiting boaters.

Shireoaks Hall
Shireoaks Hall is a Grade II* listed 17th-century country house. Shireoaks Colliery lies within what was once part of the Shireoaks estate.

Steetley Cricket Ground 

The cricket pitch along with its bowling green and tennis courts used to belong to the Steetley works in the village and was the home ground of their sporting teams. This is now under private ownership and the pavilion has been converted into a house; the new pavilion is a converted groundsman's shed. The village went without a cricket team for many years until, in 2002, Shireoaks Cricket Club was re-established; it has gone from strength to strength, fielding two adult teams on a Sunday and providing opportunities for youth cricket to flourish. The club also fields a midweek 20/20 team, and a 7-a-side indoor team, known as the Shireoaks Snails. Shireoaks no longer use the cricket ground for home games. Woodsetts CC played 1st and 2nd team fixtures at this picturesque venue until they were forced to move elsewhere. No cricket club plays there anymore.
Over the years the ground has been used for many minor county cricket matches involving the second team of Nottinghamshire, and has played host to 2 first class matches, these were;

  5 July 1961 County Championship 1961 Nottinghamshire v Sussex
  7 July 1979 West Indies Women in England 1979 3rd ODI England Women v West Indies Women

Total list of matches played: 

The ground has recently been used as a training ground for the Worksop Town Football Club Academy.

Future 

Since the closure of Shireoaks colliery the land on which it stood has remained mostly undeveloped. A marina has been constructed at the former location of the barge loading area adjacent to the Chesterfield Canal.

Due to the number of housing developments in the village and the rapid expansion of the village of Gateford near Worksop, there is a concern that Shireoaks along with the neighbouring village of Rhodesia will soon become just a part of Worksop itself.

References

External links

Villages in Nottinghamshire
Civil parishes in Nottinghamshire
Bassetlaw District